Andrew Tennant Blake (born 14 March 1996) is a professional New Zealand footballer who plays for Auckland City FC.

On 26 August 2015, he made his professional senior debut for Wellington Phoenix in the 2015 FFA Cup against Melbourne City. On 12 February 2016, following Hamish Watson joining Phoenix from Hawke's Bay United as an injury replacement, Blake was loaned out to Hawke's Bay United for the remainder of the season.

After a trial spell with Inverness Caledonian Thistle, Blake signed for Hibernian during the summer of 2017. He was then loaned to Edinburgh City in August 2017, but this deal was curtailed in January 2018 as Blake had suffered a long-term injury.

In September 2019, Blake joined Auckland City FC.

Personal life

His older brother Hugh is a rugby union player.

Career statistics

References

External links
 

Living people
1996 births
Association football midfielders
New Zealand association footballers
Wellington Phoenix FC players
Hawke's Bay United FC players
New Zealand Football Championship players
New Zealand expatriate association footballers
Expatriate footballers in Scotland
Hibernian F.C. players
F.C. Edinburgh players
New Zealand people of Scottish descent
Scottish Professional Football League players